István Suti (23 June 1939 – 18 March 2012) was a Hungarian equestrian. He competed at the 1960 Summer Olympics.

References

External links
 

1939 births
2012 deaths
Hungarian male equestrians
Olympic equestrians of Hungary
Equestrians at the 1960 Summer Olympics
Sportspeople from Csongrád-Csanád County